Omorgus asper is a beetle of the family Trogidae found in the United States and Mexico.

References

asper
Insects of Mexico
Beetles of the United States
Beetles described in 1854
Taxa named by John Lawrence LeConte